Paramenesia theaphia is a species of beetle in the family Cerambycidae. It was described by Henry Walter Bates in 1884, originally under the genus Paraglenea. It is known from Japan and Sakhalin.

References

Saperdini
Beetles described in 1884